The 2008–09 All-Ireland Senior Club Football Championship was the 39th staging of the All-Ireland Senior Club Football Championship since its establishment by the Gaelic Athletic Association in 1970-71. The championship began on 19 October 2008 and ended on 17 March 2009.

St. Vincent's were the defending champions, however, they failed to qualify after being beaten by Kilmacud Crokes in a semi-final replay of the 2008 Dublin County Championship. There were no representative clubs from Waterford or Wexford due to a delay in the completion of their county championships.

On 17 March 2009, Kilmacud Crokes won the championship following a 1-09 to 0-07 defeat of Crossmaglen Rangers in the All-Ireland final at Croke Park. It was their second championship title overall and their first title since 1995.

Kilmacud's Mark Vaughan was the championship's top scorer with 2-32.

Results

Connacht Senior Club Football Championship

Quarter-final

Semi-finals

Final

Leinster Senior Club Football Championship

First round

Quarter-finals

Semi-finals

Final

Munster Senior Club Football Championship

Quarter-finals

Semi-finals

Final

Ulster Senior Club Football Championship

Preliminary round

Quarter-final

Semi-finals

Final

All-Ireland Senior Club Football Championship

Quarter-final

Semi-finals

Final

Championship statistics

Top scorers

Overall

In a single game

Miscellaneous

 Kilanerin-Ballyfad refused to compete in the Leinster Club Championship after the Leinster Council scheduled their tie with Navan O'Mahonys one day after their Wexford Senior Championship final. Navan O'Mahonys received a walkover as a result of this decision.
 The Nire did not compete in the Munster Club Championship as the Waterford Senior Championship had not reached completion by the date of their quarter-final tie. Kilmurry-Ibrickane were granted a walkover as a result of this decision.
 Dromcollogher/Broadford won the Munster Club Championship for the first time in their history. They were the first Limerick team to win the provincial title since Thomond College in 1977.

References

External links

All-Ireland Senior Club Football Championship
All-Ireland Senior Club Football Championship
All-Ireland Senior Club Football Championship